The Hook Sin Tong Charity Building is an historic building in Victoria, British Columbia, Canada.

See also
 List of historic places in Victoria, British Columbia

References

External links
 

1911 establishments in Canada
Buildings and structures completed in 1911
Buildings and structures in Victoria, British Columbia